Zwide kaLanga (1758–1825) was the king of the Ndwandwe (Nxumalo) nation from about 1805 to around 1820. He was the son of Langa KaXaba, a Nxumalo king. Legend has it that Zwide's mother, Queen Ntombazi, was a sangoma. And she infamously collected skulls of kings conquered by Zwide because it made her feel powerful.

Political life 
Around the time Zwide became king, the Nxumalo were growing in military power.  Ambitious in expanding Nxumalo supremacy, Zwide was a prominent rival to Dingiswayo, king of the Mthethwa and his famous general and protégé, Shaka kaSenzangakhona, the founder of the Zulu Kingdom.

The Zulu people believe that he is responsible for mfecane that is falsely attributed to Shaka. Who, in fact, unified the Zulu-speaking peoples into a formidable kingdom.

Military actions 
Zwide sought to expand his borders, and in 1818 he destroyed the power of the Mthethwa Kingdom, after he had King Dingiswayo killed. He also had a battle with the young Zulu clan at the Battle of Gqokli Hill.

He destroyed and overran the neighbouring Khumalo Kingdom and executed their king, Matshobana KaMangete. Mashobana's son and heir Mzilikazi escaped from the Nxumalo and sought refuge with Shaka, who had reformed the remnant Mthethwa clan under his rule.

Knowing this, Zwide planned to destroy the Zulu Empire to secure Ndwandwe domination of Zululand.  In 1820, he led his army into battle against the Zulu at the Battle of Mhlatuze River. His forces were caught crossing halfway across the Mhlatuze River when the Zulu forces attacked, and the Nxumalo army was scattered. Zwide escaped with a remnant of his clan across the Pongola River.

After Zwide and his clansmen escaped, the Zulu attacked the rest of his people, killing many at Mome Gorge, a desolate place. The Zulu attacked the Ndwandwe capital, KwaNongoma. The Zulu victory was predated by Zwide's scattering of the Mfekane tribe which gave the impression that Shaka's victory was the beginning of the Mfecane or the scattering.  Zwide's generals fled north, where they established their own kingdoms, such as the Shangane Kingdom in Gaza, formed by Soshangane.

References

1758 births
1825 deaths
19th-century African people
Ndwandwe people